Mulchand Dube (1884-1962)  was an Indian politician. He was elected to the Lok Sabha, the lower house of the Parliament of India from the Farrukhabad constituency of Uttar Pradesh as a member of the Indian National Congress in 1952, 1957, and 1962.

References

External links
Official biographical sketch in Parliament of India website

1884 births
1962 deaths
Indian National Congress politicians
Lok Sabha members from Uttar Pradesh
India MPs 1952–1957
India MPs 1957–1962
India MPs 1962–1967